DSP-2230 is a selective small-molecule Nav1.7 and Nav1.8 voltage-gated sodium channel blocker which is under development by Dainippon Sumitomo Pharma for the treatment of neuropathic pain. As of June 2014, it is in phase I/phase II clinical trials.

See also 
 List of investigational analgesics

References

External links 
 

Amines
Analgesics
Cyclobutyl compounds
Ethers
Fluoroarenes
Imidazopyridines
Sodium channel blockers